The 1993 Monmouth Hawks football team represented Monmouth University in the 1993 NCAA Division I-AA football season as an independent. This year was the program first year of competition. The Hawks were led by first-year head coach Kevin Callahan and played their home games at Kessler Field. They finished the season with a record of 2–5.

Schedule

References

Monmouth
Monmouth Hawks football seasons
Monmouth Hawks football